Radoslav Ďuriš (born August 10, 1974 in Ilava) is a Slovak wheelchair curler.

He participated at the 2014 and 2018 Winter Paralympics where Slovak team finished on sixth and ninth places respectively.

Wheelchair curling teams and events

Mixed doubles

References

External links 

Profile at the 2014 Winter Paralympics site (web archive)
Profile at the 2018 Winter Paralympics site (web archive)
Radoslav Ďuriš | Slovenský paralympijský výbor 
 Video: 

Living people
1974 births
People from Ilava
Sportspeople from the Trenčín Region
Slovak male curlers
Slovak wheelchair curlers
Paralympic wheelchair curlers of Slovakia
Wheelchair curlers at the 2014 Winter Paralympics
Wheelchair curlers at the 2018 Winter Paralympics
Wheelchair curlers at the 2022 Winter Paralympics